Élisabeth Bergeron, in religion Sister Saint-Joseph, (May 25, 1851 – April 29, 1936) was a Canadian religious servant who was a founder of the Sisters of Saint Joseph of Saint-Hyacinthe in 1877. She was its Mother Superior for the first two years before giving the role to another sister and was either the Assistant Superior or General Councillor until 1925. Before that, Bergeron worked in a cotton mill in the New England region of the United States and taught catechism in evening school to local impoverished children with no religious education. She was beatified in Rome in 1976 and she was declared venerable by Pope John Paul II in 1996 after the Congregation for the Causes of Saints recognised her work.

Biography
Bergeron was born on May 25, 1851, in the small village of La Présentation, Quebec, Lower Canada, close to Saint-Hyacinthe. She was the fourth of eleven children of the farmer Théophile Bergeron and Basiliste Petit. After briefly going to the local rural area school located in La Présentation where she learned to read since her parents were poor, Bergeron became interested in religion from an early age, and did her first Communion in mid-1859 at the age of eight. She asked her parents if she could do her First Communion but they refused and barred her from attending catechism classes. At age 14, Bergeron unsuccessfully wanted to join the Sisters of Saint Joseph of Saint-Hyacinthe since the Superior General thought her to be too young.

She and her family later relocated to the New England region of the United States due to the economic crisis where they worked in from 1865 to 1870. Bergereon initially resided in Brunswick, Maine and then in Salem, Massachusetts, working in a cotton mill and teaching catechism at evening school in her home to local children who had no religious education since they were poor. She returned to Quebec with extra savings in March 1870, and was part of the admitted to the Sisters Adorers of the Precious Blood in March 1871 but left in July that year since the Superior General  advised her that she did not think her of having the vocation of a worshipper because of its strict rules. Bergeron briefly spent time with Montreal's Sisters of Miséricorde but she decided to leave it following a few days of being a postulate due to dissatisfaction.

In 1875, she applied to join the Sisters of the Presentation of Mary but was rejected due to her lack of education. Bergeron became a member of the Third Order of Saint Dominic, and twice proposed the creation of a Dominican contemplative congregation to her diocese's bishop Louis-Zéphirin Moreau. He noted such a congregation was already existent in her local area, he and suggested to her the formation of an teaching congregation instead. On September 12, 1877, Bergeron and three sisters (two of whom were teachers) established the Sisters of Saint Joseph of Saint-Hyacinthe in an abandoned schoolhouse in La Présentation. The school began admitting students divided into two groups of boys and girls from the morning of September 17, 1877. Death, the leaving and or illness of multiple candidates affected the congregation in its early years but it survived on local congregation donations and received heavy criticism from the diocesan hierarchy.

For the first two years, Bergeron was Mother Superior, during which she adopted the name Sister Saint-Joseph on August 17, 1878, but, on Moreau's advice, she relinquished the role to a more educated sister who was more able to deal with the school boards. She was either the Assistant Superior or General Councillor until 1925. Bergeron made the perpetual vows of obedience and poverty on March 19, 1980. In 1911, Bergeron visited the Western Canadian missions in Lorette, Manitoba and Marieval, Saskatchewan that were both established in 1901. The congregation also extended into Ontario and New Hampshire.

Personal life

She liked gardening and sewing. On April 29, 1936, Bergeron died in Saint-Hyacinthe. Her body was buried in the mausoleum in Saint-Hyacinthe Cemetery.

Legacy
The Elisabeth Bergeron Centre was opened in her name in September 1969 to promote the cause of her beatification and canonization and her life. Bergeron was eventually beatified in Rome in 1976, and she was declared venerable on January 12, 1996 by Pope John Paul II, after the Congregation for the Causes of Saints gave recognition of her "heroic virtues, especially her humility, her understanding and love of the Church and her submission to the will of God". Some buildings in the Saint-Hyacinthe area are named after her and the Elisabeth Wednesdays that took place on nine successive weekends from 2005 to 2009 were held to promote her work.

References

1851 births
1936 deaths
French Quebecers
Pre-Confederation Quebec people
19th-century Canadian nuns
20th-century Canadian nuns
Burials in Quebec
Pre-Confederation Canadian expatriates in the United States
19th-century venerated Christians
20th-century venerated Christians
Founders of Catholic religious communities
Canadian beatified people
Beatifications by Pope Paul VI
Venerated Catholics by Pope John Paul II